Dundalk entered the 1962–63 season on the back of a disappointing eighth-place finish in the League and a fifth-place finish in the Shield the previous season. 1962–63 saw the side trained by 1932–33 title-winning veteran Gerry McCourt, assisted by Mickey Fox, Colm Bellew and Shay Noonan. Team selection was still the responsibility of the club's 10-person management committee. It was Dundalk's 37th consecutive season in the top tier of Irish football.

Season summary
The new season would see the 30th anniversary of the club's only previous League title pass. Since then they had been runners-up three times. They had been uncompetitive throughout the 1950s, but had made strong challenges for the League in both 1959–60 and 1960–61. The season opened with the P.J. Casey Cup – a single-season competition run to replace matches lost due to the reduction in teams that season. It ran as a two group, single match round-robin with the top two in each group then playing off in a semi-final and final. The competition was named in memory of P.J. Casey - a long time Honorary Treasurer of the League, and former committee member at Dundalk, who had died in late 1961. Drumcondra defeated Dundalk in the final. The Shield followed, a competition Dundalk had yet to win, and they were pipped to the runners-up spot on goal average. The Dublin City Cup saw them knocked out in the first round, 4–3 on aggregate, while the Leinster Senior Cup saw them knocked out in the semi-final on corner-count after a 2–2 draw with Shelbourne.

With four competitions essentially dealt with by the time the League was up and running, all attention turned to the League schedule. A run of five wins and a draw saw Dundalk lead the table going into the new year, but a defeat and three draws in their next five games raised doubts about their ability to stay in front. Their rivals were faltering too, however, and with six games remaining Dundalk led by four points – although their closest rivals, Waterford and Drumcondra, both had two games in hand, as bad weather that winter had seen a number of postponements. Another slump in form followed, with a second round exit in the FAI Cup to Cork Hibernians and two League defeats in three weeks, leaving them top on goal average only with an extra game played. But they rallied as their rivals continued to drop points, needing a win away to Bohemians in their final match to seal the title. They went two goals behind, however, and with supporters believing they had blown the title, they came back to score twice in the last five minutes and secure a point. They then had to wait a full week for the fixture backlog to clear, with Shelbourne, Cork Celtic and Drumcondra all in the hunt. All three faltered, confirming Dundalk as Champions.

First-Team Squad (1962–63)
Sources:

a. Includes the Leinster Senior Cup, Dublin City Cup, P.J. Casey Cup, and Top Four Cup.

Competitions

P.J. Casey Cup
Source:
Group

Dundalk qualified as group runners-up
Semi-final

Final

Shield
Source:

Shield table

Dublin City Cup
Source:
First Round

Cork Hibernians won 4–3 on aggregate

Leinster Senior Cup
Source:
Fourth Round

Semi-final

Shelbourne won 8–2 on corner count

FAI Cup
Source:
First Round

Second Round

Top Four Cup
Source:
Semi-final

League
Source:

League table

References
Bibliography

Citations

Dundalk F.C. seasons
Dundalk